Sergei Gennadiyevich Scherbakov (Serhiy Hennadiyovych Shcherbakov; born 15 August 1971) is a former Ukrainian football (soccer) midfielder and a Russian football youth coach and functionary.

In Portuguese media and some FIFA sources, the footballer is also known as Serguei Cherbakov. In Portugal Scherbakov was known as a Russian footballer despite the fact of playing for Ukraine.

Career
A native of Bryansk, a city near the border with Ukraine, Sergei was born in a sports family where his father was a footballer for Soviet Novator Mariupol playing as a central defender, while mother of Sergei was a gymnast. As an athlete, he was brought up by youth coaches of Shakhtar and soon made his way to the main squad, already at his 17 he played his first game. In total, Shcherbakov played in the Soviet Top League 52 games over three seasons and scored 12 times. With dissolution of the Soviet Union, he along with Shakhtar joined the Vyshcha Liha that commenced on territory of the independent Ukraine.

He capped for USSR U-20 team at the 1991 FIFA World Youth Championship. He shared the golden shoe with Pedro Pineda in that tournament as the highest scorer with 4 goals. In 1991 following the performance of the Soviet youth teams, Scherbakov was invited to PSV Eindhoven where he spent six weeks, but for uncertain reasons was not able to sign a contract. After receiving an offer from Sporting in 1992 he did not think twice.

Shcherbakov had been brought to Sporting CP by Bobby Robson who also joined the club in July 1992. At that time among his assistants Robson had José Mourinho. Robson was complaining about "terrible situation" in the club and periodically had arguments with the club's president. The manager was fired following their Uefa Cup exit against Casino Salzburg during winter break of the 1993–94 season with Sporting CP in the lead. The players hosted a dinner party for him, but afterwards Sergey was involved in a serious car accident that left him paralysed from the waist down, and has used a wheelchair ever since. Shcherbakov went to a pub used by the Russian community, stayed until early hours and then shot a set of traffic lights. His car was hit side on. Had he been wearing the seat belt, the injuries would have been minor. The Resident newspaper also reported that he had been "over the legal alcohol limit" at the time and had jumped a red light. The accident fractured Shcherbakov's skull and his spinal column in three places. During rehabilitation he vowed he would once again don the Sporting jersey on the pitch someday but he never regained use of his legs. After the crash, Sir Bobby Robson said that had the crash not happened, Shcherbakov would have gone on to become one of the best midfielders in Europe. He was only 22.

Currently, he is working with several football-related charities, such as the Federation of Football that unites football lovers that have cerebral paralysis, as well as a youth scout, and lives in Moscow.

Career statistics

Club

International

Honours
 UEFA European Under-18 Championship champion: 1990

Individual
 FIFA World Youth Championship Golden Boot: 1991

References

External links

Cherbakov – Sporting CP. YouTube

1971 births
Living people
People from Bryansk
Soviet footballers
Soviet Union youth international footballers
Soviet Union under-21 international footballers
Russian footballers
Russia under-21 international footballers
Ukrainian footballers
Ukraine international footballers
FC Shakhtar Donetsk players
Sporting CP footballers
Primeira Liga players
Association football midfielders
Expatriate footballers in Portugal
Ukrainian expatriate sportspeople in Portugal